The Initiative on the Safe Transportation of Grain and Foodstuffs from Ukrainian ports, also called the Black Sea Grain Initiative, is an agreement between Russia and Ukraine made with Turkey and the United Nations (UN) during the 2022 Russian invasion of Ukraine.

The Russian invasion of Ukraine in February led to a complete halt of maritime grain shipments from Ukraine, previously a major exporter via the Black Sea. This resulted in a rise in world food prices and the threat of famine in lower-income countries. To address the issue, discussions began in April, hosted by Turkey (which controls the maritime routes from the Black Sea) and supported by the UN. The resulting agreement was signed in Istanbul on 22 July 2022, valid for a period of 120 days.

The July agreement created procedures to safely export grain from certain ports to attempt to address the 2022 food crisis. A joint coordination and inspection center was set up in Turkey, with the UN serving as secretariat. The original agreement was set to expire on 19 November 2022.  Russia suspended its participation in the agreement for several days due to a drone attack on Russian naval ships elsewhere in the Black Sea, but rejoined following mediation. On 17 November 2022, the UN and Ukraine announced that the agreement had been extended for a further 120 days.

By early February 2023, more than 715 voyages had successfully left Ukrainian ports carrying over 20 million tonnes of grain and other food products. In March of that year, Turkey and the UN announced that they were facilitating negotiations for a second extension.

Background

In 2022, 47 million people were estimated to be suffering from severe hunger as a result of the world's soaring food costs partly due to the impact of the 2022 Russian invasion of Ukraine. Developing and emerging countries in Africa, Asia, and Latin America have been impacted the most by this war due to their reliance on imported grain and fuel.

According to the UN Food and Agriculture Organization, Ukraine is among the world's leading grain exporters, providing more than 45 million tonnes annually to the global market. Some 20 million tonnes of grain had been held up in the Ukrainian port city of Odesa, according to the BBC. Almost all of Ukraine's wheat, corn, and sunflower oil were exported through its Black Sea ports prior to the conflict. Before the agreement, some ports' infrastructure has been harmed while others are under Russian control and others are blocked by mines. Initially, the Ukrainian government was reluctant to de-mine the sea due to the scale of the task and the possibility of leaving the ports open to attack.

Timeline

25 April 2022: UN Secretary-General António Guterres and Turkish President Recep Tayyip Erdoğan held a meeting to discuss the impact of the conflict on global issues, including food, energy, and finance.
26 April: Guterres met with Russian President Vladimir Putin, describing the meeting as "very useful".
28 April: Guterres met with Ukrainian President Volodymyr Zelensky and other officials to discuss the food crisis.
26 May: Russia modified the route of its "blue safe maritime corridor" from Ukrainian ports through its Maritime Exclusion Zone to increase safety for merchant vessels.
3 June: Putin met with the President of the African Union, Macky Sall, to discuss grain deliveries from Russia and Ukraine to Africa.
7 June: Russian and Turkish defence ministers discussed several topics including a potential grain export corridor from Ukraine.
8 July: Russian foreign minister Sergey Lavrov stated that Russia would let grain exports out if Ukraine de-mines the water around its ports.
11 July: Zelenskiy said he had held talks with Erdogan on the need to unblock ports of Ukraine and resume grain exports.
13 July: Military delegations from Russia, Turkey and Ukraine met with a UN delegation in Istanbul.
19 July: In a meeting in Iran, Putin met Erdogan to discuss the export of grain.
22 July: The signing ceremony for the documents was held in Istanbul in the presence of Guterres, Erdogan, Russian Defense Minister Sergei Shoigu, Ukrainian Infrastructure Minister Oleksandr Kubrakov and Turkish Defense Minister Hulusi Akar.
 23 July: less than a day after signing a grain export deal, Russia bombed the Odesa sea trade port.
25 July: Preparation is done by the Ukrainian Sea Ports Authority (USPA) for the resumption of the export of grain.
27 July: The Joint Coordination Centre (JCC) is officially inaugurated in Istanbul.
28 July: UN aid chief Martin Griffiths said that the first shipment could take place as early as Friday, but that "crucial" details were still being worked out.
29 July: In an unannounced appearance in Odesa, Zelensky said that a Ukrainian ship was ready and waiting for the signal to leave port.
31 July: Turkish Presidential spokesperson İbrahim Kalın announced that the first ship may depart as soon as Monday (1 August) and at the latest by Tuesday (2 August).
1 August: The Razoni, the first ship loaded with Ukrainian grain, was reported to have left the port of Odesa. The destination of the ship was Lebanon.
7 September: the total number of vessels leaving Ukraine to date in accordance with the agreement reaches 100.
28 October: the total number of vessels leaving Ukraine to date in accordance with the agreement reaches 400.
29 October: Russia suspends its participation.
2 November: Russia resumes its participation.
15 November: Ukraine proposes expanding the initiative to Ukraine’s Mykolaiv Port and Olvia Port in the Mykolaiv Oblast.
19 November: Agreement is extended for a further 120 days, with the new deadline being March 18, 2023.
27 November: The total number of vessels leaving Ukraine to date in accordance with the agreement reaches 500.
18 March 2023: Russia and Ukraine, in talks hosted by Turkey and the UN, have agreed to extend the deal by a further an unknown period of time.

Agreement 

On July 22, 2022, the signing ceremony took place at Dolmabahçe Palace in Istanbul, Turkey. The ceremony marks the first major deal between the warring sides since the beginning of the Russian invasion in February. However, it was not a direct agreement between Russia and Ukraine. Instead, Ukraine signed an agreement with Turkey and the UN, and Russia signed a separate "mirror" agreement with Turkey and the UN.

The signed documents entail the safe navigation for the export of grain and related foodstuffs and fertilizers, including ammonia from the Ukrainian ports of Odesa, Chornomorsk and Yuzhne. The ships would traverse the Black Sea in specially created corridors that are demined, with Turkey inspecting all merchant vessels. Another agreement was concurrently made for the UN to facilitate unimpeded exports of Russian food, fertilizer and raw materials.

Joint Coordination Centre 

As part of the agreement, a Joint Coordination Centre (JCC) was created under the auspices of the UN in Istanbul on July 27. The JCC is tasked with registering and monitoring the departure of commercial ships via satellite, internet, and other communication means. Its primary responsibility is to check for the absence of unauthorized cargo and personnel on board of the vessels.  The JCC is located on the campus of the National Defense University, about seven kilometers north of the center of Istanbul. The center is headed by a Turkish admiral. A total of 20 delegates are employed (five representatives from the four involved parties each). Ukrainians and Russians work separately from each other and contact between them happens only in emergency situations if deemed necessary.

Aftermath
Following the deal, wheat prices dropped to pre-war levels.

On 23 July, less than a day after signing a grain export deal, it was reported that Russia launched Kalibr missiles at the Odesa sea trade port. Russian officials told Turkey that Russia had "nothing to do" with the missile strike. The next day, Igor Konashenkov, a spokesman of the Russian Ministry of Defence, confirmed the strike, claiming that it destroyed a Ukrainian warship and a warehouse of Harpoon anti-ship missiles. Following the attack, insurers were more reluctant to insure trading ships sailing to Ukraine. The United Kingdom said it would help achieve insurance for the companies involved.

On 1 August, the first ship left a Ukrainian port. As of 26 August, according to Ukrainian President Volodymyr Zelenskyy, some 1 million tonnes of grain had been exported by Ukraine. According to the Ukrainian President, the stated aim is at least 3 million tonnes a month. On 4 September, Ukraine dispatched 282,500 tonnes of agricultural products to eight countries in 13 vessels, the largest daily total to that date. In mid-October, Ukraine's grain exports were running about 36 percent lower than during the previous season. 

By 8 February 2023, 20.5 million tonnes of agricultural products had been dispatched to more than 40 countries in 721 voyages. In 2022, Turkey (170), Spain (100), Italy (81), China (51), and Egypt (30) received the most voyages.

As of October 2022, the widescale theft of Ukrainian grain was continuing and involved both private companies and Russian state operatives. Some of the stolen grain is laundered through transfers and by mixing it with legitimate goods. Ukraine intended to export 60 million tonnes over nine months if their ports continued to function well. "Solidarity corridors" were organized on the borders of Ukraine by the European Union for passage of grain through European rail, road, and river cargo shipment to destined countries, 60% of Ukrainian grain were exported through the European "solidarity corridors" and remaining through the Black Sea ports, unblocked according to the Istanbul agreements till October 2022.

Controversies and temporary Russian withdrawal 
The agreement, initially applicable for a period of only four months, was set to expire on 19 November 2022 unless renewed. In mid-October, Russian diplomats at the UN stated that a renewed agreement must also allow for increased exports of Russian grain and fertilizers. Ukraine criticized the Russian stance and stated it had no additional demands beyond the July terms it had previously agreed to. The UN coordinator for the agreement, Amir Mahmoud Abdulla, expressed hope that a renewal agreement could be reached as the UN continued to facilitate discussions.

On 29 October, Russia suspended its participation in the agreement because of a massed drone attack on the Port of Sevastopol. Russia suggested that Ukraine had misused a cargo ship to conduct the strike, but UN stated that no cargo ships were in the grain corridor on the night of the attack. A number of grain ships continued to depart from Ukrainian ports with the UN and Turkey's approval, although it is unclear whether shipments can go on indefinitely. Insurers paused the issuing of insurance for future vessel movements under the initiative. Russia resumed its participation on 2 November after Turkish and UN mediation. Russia stated Ukraine had agreed not to use the grain export corridor to conduct military operations against Russia, while Ukraine stated no new assurances were given as Ukraine will not make military use of the corridor.

Renewals 
On 16 November, Turkish president Recep Tayyip Erdoğan expressed confidence that it would be renewed for up to a year. The next day, the UN and Ukraine announced that the agreement had been extended for a further 120 days, with the new deadline being March 18, 2023. By March 2023, Turkey and the UN announced they were facilitating negotiations for a second extension of the deal, with discussions having taken place. Russia had previously stated that it would have accepted a renewal of the deal only if its own exports were unblocked, which had been previously hampered due to Western sanctions that had indirectly affected their agricultural industry. Later that month, Russia had proposed to renew the deal for only 60 days, which Ukraine had refused. However, by March 18, it was confirmed that the deal had been extended, though the UN nor Turkey had confirmed for how long. Despite this, Russia and Ukraine had both claimed the deal had been extended for 60 and 120 days, respectively.

Reactions
The agreement was well received by the international community while maintaining concerns over its implementation. Canadian Prime Minister Justin Trudeau stated that the G7 is "working closely with partners like Turkey and others" to get the grain out of Ukraine, while having no confidence in Russia's reliability. EU foreign policy chief Josep Borrell tweeted that the agreement was a "step in the right direction" and welcomed the efforts by 
the UN and Turkey.

The British Foreign Secretary Liz Truss welcomed the deal and said to be "watching to ensure Russia's actions match its words". Guy Platten, the Secretary-General of the International Chamber of Shipping, called the agreement a "long-needed breakthrough for the millions of people who rely on the safe passage of grain to survive". African leaders, whose countries import food from Ukraine and Russia, welcomed the agreement, with South African President Cyril Ramaphosa saying "it has taken much too long".

At the signing ceremony, UN Secretary-General António Guterres called the agreement "a beacon of hope". It would "bring relief for developing countries on the edge of bankruptcy and the most vulnerable people on the edge of famine." He also called the persistence of President Erdogan through every step of this process essential. Russian Defense Minister Sergei Shoigu said after the signing ceremony that Russia would not take advantage of the fact that the ports would be cleared and opened.

At the 38th meeting of the Standing Committee for Economic and Commercial Cooperation (COMCEC) of the Organization of Islamic Cooperation (OIC) in Istanbul, Erdogan remarked that over 11 million tonnes of grain had been transported through the Black Sea Grain Corridor since the implementation of the agreement. He also noted that the opening of the grain corridor through the Black Sea showed that a diplomatic solution is possible in the conflict between Russia and Ukraine.

Notes

See also

 2022 Russia–Ukraine peace negotiations
 Russia–Turkey relations
 Russia–Ukraine relations
 Turkey–Ukraine relations
 Russia and the United Nations
 Turkey and the United Nations
 Ukraine and the United Nations
 United States grain embargo against the Soviet Union

References

External links

 UN-maintained database of vessel movements and tonnages under the agreement
 UN-maintained database of countries receiving cargo under the agreement broken down by income level

2022 in Turkey
2022 in Russia
2022 in Ukraine
Grain and the 2022 Russian invasion of Ukraine
2022 in international relations
2022 in Istanbul
Agreements
Grain trade
Food politics
Agriculture in Ukraine
Agriculture in Russia
Foreign trade of Ukraine
Foreign trade of Russia
Russia–Turkey relations
Turkey–Ukraine relations
Turkey and the United Nations
Ukraine and the United Nations
Russia and the United Nations
Vladimir Putin
Volodymyr Zelenskyy
Recep Tayyip Erdoğan
Events affected by the 2022 Russian invasion of Ukraine
History of the Black Sea